Chico Faria Camará Lamba (born 10 March 2003) is a professional footballer who plays as a centre-back for Primeira Liga club Sporting CP. Born in Guinea-Bissau, he is a youth international for Portugal.

Club career
Lamba is a youth product of CF Benfica, and moved to Sporting CP's youth academy at the age of 10 in 2014. On October 2020, he was integrated with Sporting CP B. In the summer of 2022, he started training with the senior team of Sporting. On 7 July 2022, he extended his contract with the club until 2024. He made his professional debut with Sporting as a half-time substitute in a 3–1 Primeira Liga win over Casa Pia on 22 October 2022.

International career
Lamba was born in Guinea-Bissau and moved to Portugal at a young age, and holds dual citizenship. He is a youth international for Portugal, having played up to the Portugal U19s.

References

External links

2003 births
Living people
Sportspeople from Bissau
Portuguese footballers
Portugal youth international footballers
Bissau-Guinean footballers
Bissau-Guinean emigrants to Portugal
Portuguese sportspeople of Bissau-Guinean descent
Association football defenders
Sporting CP footballers
Sporting CP B players
Primeira Liga players